The 2013 Quebec Men's Provincial Curling Championship (also known as the Quebec Tankard) was held from January 21 to 27 at the Complexe Sportif Victoriaville in Victoriaville, Quebec. The winning team represented Quebec at the 2013 Tim Hortons Brier in Edmonton, Alberta.

Qualification

Teams
The teams are listed as follows:

Round robin standings
Final Round Robin Standings

Round robin results
All draw times are listed in Eastern Standard Time (UTC−5).

Draw 1
Monday, January 21, 19:45

Draw 2
Tuesday, January 22, 8:15

Draw 3
Tuesday, January 22, 15:45

Draw 4
Wednesday, January 23, 8:15

Draw 5
Wednesday, January 23, 15:45

Draw 6
Thursday, January 24, 12:00

Draw 7
Thursday, January 24, 19:30

Draw 8
Friday, January 25, 10:30

Draw 9
Friday, January 25, 18:00

Playoffs

1 vs. 2
Saturday, January 26, 14:00

3 vs. 4
Saturday, January 26, 19:00

Semifinal
Sunday, January 27, 09:00

Final
Sunday, January 27, 14:00

References

External links

Quebec Men's Provincial Curling Championship
Quebec Men's Provincial Curling Championship
Sport in Victoriaville
Curling in Quebec